The Coleraine railway line was a railway line branching off of the Portland railway line at Coleraine Junction station. It was opened on November 20, 1888, and was officially closed on September 12, 1977. It is now a Rail trail.

Line Guide 

Branched from Portland railway line at Coleraine Junction station

Bocharra

Wannon

Parkwood (originally named Gritjurk)

Coleraine

References 

Closed regional railway lines in Victoria (Australia)
Railway lines opened in 1888
Railway lines closed in 1977
Transport in Barwon South West (region)